NPO Zappelin Extra was a digital theme TV channel jointly operated by AVROTROS, EO, KRO-NCRV, NTR and VPRO. The TV channel launched as Zappelin 24 on 30 May 2009. It broadcasts replays and broadcasts from NPO Zapp and NPO Zappelin, via the cable and internet. The TV channel was part of the Nederlandse Publieke Omroep. On 10 March 2014, Z@ppelin / Z@pp 24 changed its name into NPO Zapp Xtra.

NPO Zapp Xtra became a 24-hour channel on 25 December 2018 and was renamed NPO Zappelin Extra. NPO Zapp Xtra used to time-share with NPO 1 Extra until 25 December 2018 and has since taken over the former frequency of the defunct channel, NPO 3 Extra.

NPO Zappelin Extra closed on 15 December 2021.

Current programing 
Dinopaws
The Smurfs
Planet Cosmo
Cars Toons: Mater's Tall Tales
Yeti Tales
Pat & Mat
Ducktales
Kid-E-Cats
Fishtronaut
Pinky and the Brain
Dino Dan
Shimmer and Shine
Zig & Sharko

Former programming 
Little Einsteins
Thomas & Friends
Het Zandkasteel

References

External links 

 Official Website NPO Zappelin Extra

Defunct television channels in the Netherlands
Television channels and stations established in 2009
Television channels and stations disestablished in 2021